Primal Massacre is the fifth album by Swedish death metal band Vomitory. It was released on April 19, 2004, on Metal Blade.

Track listing 
 "Primal Massacre" – 3:30
 "Gore Apocalypse" – 3:54
 "Stray Bullet Kill" – 4:06
 "Epidemic (Created to Kill)" – 3:45
 "Demons Divine" – 3:45
 "Autopsy Extravaganza" – 2:58
 "Retaliation" – 2:55
 "Condemned by Pride" – 3:49
 "Cursed Revelations" – 2:21
 "Chainsaw Surgery" – 3:11

Personnel 
 Erik Rundqvist – bass guitar, vocals
 Tobias Gustafsson – drums
 Ulf Dalegren – guitar
 Urban Gustafsson – guitar
Vomitory – production
Henrik Larrson – production

References

2004 albums
Vomitory (band) albums
Metal Blade Records albums